Mary Reid may refer to:
 Mary Reid Macarthur (1880–1921), Scottish suffragist and trades unionist
 Mary Hiester Reid (1854–1921), American-born Canadian painter and teacher
 Mary Martha Reid (1812–1894), Florida's "most famous nurse and Confederate heroine"
 Mary Greyeyes-Reid (1920–2011), first woman of the First Nations to join the Canadian Women's Army Corps
 Mary E. Wrinch (1878–1969), British-Canadian artist